The Union Pacific is the largest rail system in the United States. The rail system is owned by the Union Pacific Railroad, a Class I railroad owned by the Union Pacific Corporation. 

Union Pacific may also refer to:

 , a 1934 ballet by Nicolas Nabokov and Léonide Massine, Ballet Russe de Monte-Carlo
 Union Pacific (film), a 1939 film directed by Cecil B. DeMille and starring Barbara Stanwyck and Joel McCrea
 Union Pacific (TV series), a Western television series
 Union Pacific (board game), a board game by Alan R. Moon, third place for the Deutscher Spiele Preis
 Union Pacific (restaurant), an American restaurant based in New York City

See also
 Pacific Union